Edlitz is a Market town in the district of Neunkirchen in the Austrian state of Lower Austria.

Geography 
Edlitz is located in Bucklige Welt in the industrial district near Aspang-Markt. The area of ​​the market town covers 14.23 square kilometers. Exactly 50 percent of the area is forested.

Congregational Structure 
The community forms the cadastral community Edlitz. This consists of Edlitz-Markt and the districts of Baumgart, Ebenhof, Grimmenstein, Grub, Handler, Hofstatt, Hofstetten, Kamerallen, Kohlreuth, Prägart, Pumperwaldl, Rauchlehen, Schafferhof, Schauerberg, Schneeweißhof, Sonnberg, Wieden and Winterhof.

History

Antiquity and the Middle Ages 
The area used to be part of the Roman province of Noricum.

Due to the abundance of water in the Pittental and the associated frequent flooding, the first settlements in this area were difficult to access in the elevated side valleys. A find of Roman coins suggests that the transition area from the Edlitztal to the Pittental was already inhabited in Roman times. From the Middle Ages, the history of the place is very closely linked to the development of the church and the parish.

The parish seat "de Edelz" was first mentioned in 1192 CE, when it was separated from the mother parish of Bromberg and an independent parish was set up.

Late Medieval Ages and Early Modern Era (Incursions by Hungarians, Turks and Kurucs) 
In the following centuries, Edlitz was hit by numerous Hungarian and later Turkish invasions. Several epidemics occurred. In the year 1349 CE, a separate plague cemetery had to be built for the many dead.

In 1529 CE, Edlitz escaped a Turkish attack when the Turks approached the area, but were startled by the midday ringing of the bells and turned back.

In 1590 CE, Edlitz was first referred to as a market town, which then had 14 houses.

In 1608 CE, pastor Georg Hayden was kidnapped by Hungarian forces to Güns and only released after 6 weeks after paying a ransom of 200 guilders. As a thank you, he donated the frescoes in the chancel of the parish church.

There are two more reports of military raids in the Edlitz area, namely in 1620 CE by Hungarians and in 1707 CE by Kurucs (anti-Hasburg insurgents). The fortifications of the church were likely used as a hiding place at this time.

Modern period 
At the end of the 18th century, Edlitz once played an important role in economic and transport life in the Bucklige Welt. A description of the country that was carried out by Emperor Joseph II wrote about the town of Edlitz at the time: "Ein mittelmäßig solid gebauter Markt in einem Graben, hat auch eine solide Kirche, mit Kirchhofmauern umgeben." ("A moderately solidly built market in a ditch also has a solid church surrounded by churchyard walls.") That a place was "solid" at that time referred to the fact it was built of stone.

The town was often hit by flooding from the Edlitzbach. In 1886 CE a person died in the flooding, the creek was secured by a torrent barrier.

Etymology 
The etymology is unclear, there are two theories:

 One refers to a Latin deed of donation from 860 CE, in which forty estates, some of which were located in the area of the Bucklige Welt, were donated to the Archbishopric of Salzburg. One of them was "ad ecclesiam Ellodis" ("near the church of Ello"). Ello is a Germanic name that translates as "the noble". This is thought to form the term "de Edelz"  would mean "settlement of a nobleman" which became Edlitz.
 A second - more popular theory - says that the name "Edlitz" is derived from the Slavic "jedlica" ("fir stream"), which could be attributed to the wooded area around the place.

Transport routes and tourism 
The 19th century brought a significant improvement in traffic conditions, when Count Palffy had the equestrian bridge from Grimmenstein to Edlitz and further on via Thomasberg to Kirchschlag and Güns expanded into a country road in 1815 CE. Today the federal highway runs along this former Palffy-Straße.

In 1881 CE, the opening of the Aspangbahn brought a new era to the Bucklige Welt. Edlitz station was built outside the municipal boundaries because the building site in Grimmenstein, which was then called "Am Treitl", was cheaper. Today Edlitz-Grimmenstein station is in the municipality of Thomasberg.

The opening of the railway connection also meant the start of tourism in Edlitz. Primarily guests from Vienna liked to come to the Bucklige Welt for summer holidays. According to the Austrian address book in 1938 CE, there was a doctor, two bakers, a butcher, a hairdresser, five innkeepers, five grocers, a glazier, two cellulose factories, a master bricklayer, four millers, a mill construction company and two fruit and vegetable dealers in the market town of Edlitz, two boarding houses, three sawmills, two blacksmiths, three tailors and seven seamstresses, six cobblers, a soda water producer, two tobacconists, three carpenters, a watchmaker, a cattle dealer, a grocer, two wheelwrights, a dental technician, a master carpenter and some farmers are resident.

In 1972 CE there were a total of 32,000 overnight stays in Edlitz. Today, tourism is still an important economic factor for the community, but the number of overnight stays is nowhere near as high. In recent years, the main focus of the municipality has been on improving the infrastructure in the areas of road construction, water supply, canal, kindergarten, fire station and office building.

Demographics

Religion

Population

Culture

Edlitz Parish Church 
Catholic parish church Edlitz houses a fortified churches in the Bucklige Welt. The origins of the church date back to the second half of the 12th century CE. Almost square in plan with four cross-vaulted bays supported in the middle by a pillar, the nave is the main building element. The bell tower almost disappears behind the high roof of the church. When the nave was rebuilt in 1492 CE, the sacred building was equipped with fortified structures. The fortifications are still there today: cast oriel, loopholes, upper fortification floor in the attic with block chamber, former cistern under the church floor. The last exterior renovation took place in 1978 CE, the interior of the church was last renovated in 1984 CE (interior renovation, exposure of various versions of stone ribs and painting, restoration of the high altar, pulpit, Stations of the Cross and saints) and 2003 CE (redesign of the chancel). In autumn 2005 CE the roof was re-covered. The Edlitz parish church has five bells, the oldest comes from Lazlo Raczko from 1518 CE, another from 1757 CE, all others were purchased in 1948 CE.

The parsonage formed a unit with the fortified churchyard. The oldest surviving part is characterized by a gate that allowed access independently from the churchyard. A small stone tablet set into the wall above the gate bears the year 1463 CE and the name Oswald in Latin letters. Around the church you can still find the remains of the former churchyard defence walls.

Economy 
There were 36 non-agricultural workplaces in 2001, and 55 agricultural and forestry businesses according to the 1999 survey. According to the 2001 census, the number of people in work at the place of residence was 478. The employment rate in 2001 was 48.5 percent.

There are small deposits of lignite on both sides of the road from Edlitz to Krumbach, but these are not worth mining.

Education 
Edlitz is home to a few educational facilities:

 Lower Austria state kindergarten Edlitz
 Elementary school
 Edlitz Middle school 
 Music School Artes Iuventutis

Personalities 

 Franz Koller, farmer and politician, member of the Austrian National Council and member of the Bundesrat
 Hermann Schützenhöfer, ÖVP state party chairman and governor of Styria
 Karl Pichelbauer, provost emeritus of Wiener Neustadt
 Fjodor Fjodorowitsch Tornau (Theodor von Tornau): The Russian lieutenant general and Baltic baron, who had been military attaché in Vienna for a long time, chose Edlitz as his retirement home and died here on January 4, 1890.
 Nikolaus Schmidhofer alias Holzknechtseppl (* December 6, 1794; † November 20, 1828 executed in Pinkafeld): The notorious leader of the Stradafüßler gang of robbers is often incorrectly referred to as a native Edlitzer, although he lived in 1794 in Tyrnau near Fronleiten, Vorder Tyrnau. According to tradition, he was later placed with a foster family in Edlitz.

Literature 
Market community Edlitz (ed.): Edlitz – our home community. 2 vols., 1992

Politics

Edlitz Council Office Building 
The municipal council has 15 members.

Mayors

External links 

 https://www.edlitz.at/
 https://www.noe.gv.at/noe/Edlitz.html
 https://www.gedaechtnisdeslandes.at/orte/action/show/controller/Ort/?tx_gdl_gdl%5Bort%5D=457
 https://www.statistik.at/blickgem/gemDetail.do?gemnr=31807&gemnam=Edlitz
 https://edlitz.topothek.at/

References

 Adressbuch von Österreich für Industrie, Handel, Gewerbe und Landwirtschaft, Herold Vereinigte Anzeigen-Gesellschaft, 12. Ausgabe, Wien 1938 PDF, Seite 230
 ↑ Leopold Weber, Alfred Weiss: Bergbaugeschichte und Geologie der österreichischen Braunkohlenvorkommen. Archiv für Lagerstättenforschung der Geologischen Bundesanstalt. Wien 1983. ISBN 978-3-900312-26-8. Seiten 239–240. (PDF, 34 MB)
 ↑ Wahlergebnis Gemeinderatswahl 1995 in Edlitz. Amt der NÖ Landesregierung, 30 March 2000, retrieved 3 October 2019.
 ↑ Wahlergebnis Gemeinderatswahl 2000 in Edlitz. Amt der NÖ Landesregierung, 4 February 2005, retrieved 3 October 2019.
 ↑ Wahlergebnis Gemeinderatswahl 2005 in Edlitz. Amt der NÖ Landesregierung, 4 March 2005, retrieved 3 October 2019.
 ↑ Wahlergebnis Gemeinderatswahl 2010 in Edlitz. Amt der NÖ Landesregierung, 8 October 2010, retrieved 3 October 2019.
 ↑ Wahlergebnis Gemeinderatswahl 2015 in Edlitz. Amt der NÖ Landesregierung, 1 December 2015, retrieved 3 October 2019.
 ↑ Wahlergebnis Gemeinderatswahl 2020 in Edlitz. Amt der NÖ Landesregierung, 26 January 2020, retrieved 26 January 2020.
 ↑ Christoph Tepperberg: Der Holzknechtseppl aus Festschrift 680 Jahre Marktgemeinde Riedlingsdorf, Riedlingsdorf 2011, Herausgeber Marktgemeinde Riedlingsdorf
 ↑ Johann Anton Laschober: Aus dem Leben eines Räuberhauptmannes aus Edlitz – unsere Heimatgemeinde, Edlitz 1992, Herausgeber Marktgemeinde Edlitz

Cities and towns in Neunkirchen District, Austria
Bucklige Welt